Yarimburgaz Cave is a cave of significant archaeological and paleontological importance, located within Istanbul Province, Turkey.

Location

It is situated in a locality known today as Altınşehir, within the neighborhood of Güvercintepe in Başakşehir district.

Geology and formation
The cave was formed as a result of a subterranean river eroding an ancient limestone formation. It has two entrances, one above the other. The cave is on the eastern bank of the Sazlıdere creek, which empties into Lake Küçükçekmece. The entrances face southwards overlooking Sazlıdere Valley. After about  inside, a short, sloping passage connects both caves.

Scientific research

The cave is an important fossil site which has been researched by archeologists, paleontologists, geoarchaeologists and biospeleologists. Scientific exploration of the cave began in the mid-19th century. Excavation attempts made in 1920 were followed by systematic archaeological work in the 1980s financially supported by the National Geographic Society.

In the Byzantine era, a cave-church was carved into the walls of the upper cave, and a monastery was built outside the cave mouth. Although these alterations may have resulted in the loss of prehistoric material, some artefacts remain in the cave. In the upper cave, traces of settlements were found dating back to the Upper Paleolithic subdivision of the Stone Age up until the Chalcolithic period of the Bronze Age. These traces were lying on beach sand from the last interglacial period and beneath debris from Byzantine and later times. The beach sand covers sediments with Lower Paleolithic artifacts. The upper cave was destroyed by treasure hunting and illicit diggings, which left -deep pits. Unlike the prehistoric deposits found in the lower cave, the upper cave lacks any evidence of debris from that era.

The existence of paleontological and archaeological findings point towards the use of the cave as a human and an animal habitat, alternatively. The finds include bones of herbivore and carnivore mammals, marine and freshwater molluscs, microfauna as well as artifacts like potsherds, knives on flint, oldowans, choppers and hammerstones on quartzite, as well as manuports. The wide variety of prehistoric faunal specimens belong to bones of herbivore mammals such as cave bears (Ursus deningeri), horses (Equus caballus), wild boars (Sus scrofa), fallow deer (Dama dama), roe deer (Capreolus capreolus), deer (Megaloceros), cattle (Bos/Bison), antilopes (Gazella), goats (Capra), and carnivores such as wolves and dogs (Canis), foxes (Vulpes), tigers (Panthera), cats (Felis) and hyenas (Crocuta). Findings of "more than 5000 fossil bones and teeth of cave and brown bears", which provide some chronological indicators, led to their extensive scientific study.

Some artifacts found in Yarımburgaz Cave are exhibited in the Istanbul Archaeology Museums.

In 2001, Yarımburgaz Cave was declared an archaeological-nature reserve of first grade. It is also listed as "Cultural Property under Enhanced Protection".

Human impact

During the last two decades, the cave suffered serious, irreversible damage caused by the external interactions of humans. Following scientific excavations inside the cave, and the related publications in the 1990s, the cave gained wide popularity. For this reason, it was brought to the attention of several picnickers, treasure hunters, illegal explorers, amateur speleologists and archaeologists due to its past use as a historic cave-church and its proximity to the city center. In order to prevent further damage, the cave was closed off with iron bar gates during the scientific excavations between 1988 and 1990. However, because of neglect by the respective authorities, the gates lost their function in later years, and the cave would inevitably become a shelter frequented by drug users and prostitutes, who littered it. Currently, the cave walls are painted and scratched with graffiti.

To establish a mushroom farm inside the cave, the cave grounds were leveled by a grader. The mouth of the cave was enlarged even to enable the grader's entry.

The cave was also used several times as a setting in filmmaking and television productions that left permanent modifications inside the cave. The cave featured in the 1971 movie Ali Baba ve Kırk Haramiler (English: "Ali Baba and the Forty Thieves"), based on the folk tale Ali Baba, with a role as the treasure cave that opens with the magic words "open sesame" and closes off with "close sesame", respectively. For the filming of an episode of the television series Küçük Ağa (English: "Little Agha"), historic frescos on the cave walls were scratched off and removed, and some of them were painted over with exit signs. During the filming of the science-fiction movie Yorr’un Öyküsü (English: "The Story of Yorr"), a large pool was built inside the cave, which was then detonated by explosives according to the scenario. The cave also became a setting for the television comedy series Leyla ile Mecnun produced by the state-owned Turkish Radio and Television Corporation (TRT), in which fire was set to depict hell. The filming of some episodes of the television series Muhteşem Yüzyıl (English: "The Magnificent Century"), a prime-time historical soap opera, inside the cave without proper permission allegedly caused damage to the cave. As such, the Ministry of Culture and Tourism filed a complaint against the producers.

A group of local politicians inspected the cave in February 2015, and reported that the cave's protection is still neglected despite its importance and status.

See also
 Lake Küçükçekmece

References

External links

Caves of Turkey
Archaeological sites in the Marmara Region
Paleontology in Turkey
Pleistocene paleontological sites of Europe
Paleolithic
Chalcolithic sites
Landforms of Istanbul Province
Başakşehir